The Kings Mountain Historical Museum is a local history museum at 100 East Mountain in Kings Mountain, North Carolina.  It is located in the former United States Post Office building, a handsome Colonial Revival structure built in 1940 with funding from a Depression-era works program.  The building was used as a post office until 1986.  The city acquired the building in 2000, and leased it to the local historical society, which has used it as a museum since.

The building was listed on the National Register of Historic Places in 2015.

See also
National Register of Historic Places listings in Cleveland County, North Carolina

References

External links
 Kings Mountain Historical Museum - official site

Post office buildings on the National Register of Historic Places in North Carolina
Colonial Revival architecture in North Carolina
Government buildings completed in 1940
Buildings and structures in Cleveland County, North Carolina
National Register of Historic Places in Cleveland County, North Carolina
Museums in Cleveland County, North Carolina
History museums in North Carolina
Museums established in 2000
2000 establishments in North Carolina